The 1998–99 Duke Blue Devils men's basketball team represented Duke University. The head coach was Mike Krzyzewski. The team played its home games in the Cameron Indoor Stadium in Durham, North Carolina, and was a member of the Atlantic Coast Conference.

Roster

Schedule

|-
!colspan=9 style=|Regular season

|-
!colspan=9 style=|ACC Tournament

|-
!colspan=9 style=|NCAA tournament

Awards and honors
 Mike Krzyzewski, Naismith College Coach of the Year
 Mike Krzyzewski, ACC Coach of the Year
 Elton Brand, ACC Player of the Year, Adolph Rupp Trophy, Oscar Robertson Trophy, Naismith College Player of the Year, John R. Wooden Award

Team players drafted into the NBA

References

External links
Statistical Database- Duke Blue Devils Basketball Statistical Database

Duke Blue Devils
Duke Blue Devils men's basketball seasons
NCAA Division I men's basketball tournament Final Four seasons
Duke Blue Devils men's b
Duke Blue Devils men's b
Duke